The Embassy of the United Kingdom in Beijing (or British Embassy, Beijing) is the chief diplomatic mission of the United Kingdom in the People's Republic of China. It is one of Britain's largest overseas embassies. It is located at 11 Guanghua Road, in the Chaoyang District. The current British Ambassador to China is Caroline Wilson.

History

The old British legation was established on 26 March 1861 in the former palace of Duke I-liang and Sir Frederick Bruce became the first “Envoy Extraordinary and Minister Plenipotentiary” to Imperial China to reside in Beijing. Considering the place substandard, work began to find a replacement, and the legation was moved to "Leang-Koong-foo" (the Duke of Leang's palace) in 1866, where it would stay until 1959.

In 1959 the Chinese authorities required the British to vacate their location as they wanted to redevelop the land for use as the Supreme People's Court. In January 1959 the British were informed that "the centre of Peking was scheduled for reconstruction and that the area occupied by the British Legation was required for the site of a large new building for the Judicial Executive. The staff of the Legation was therefore requested to move out of their quarters by May 31st 1959”. In exchange for vacating their old premises in 1959, the Chinese authorities built and offered the British their current embassy and residence in the diplomatic district. The embassy consists of two two-storey houses set in walled gardens. Another reason was that the building was symbolic of the unequal treaties and the century of humiliation for many Chinese, so shifting to a new one would help shed that historical baggage.

During the Cultural Revolution and at the tail-end of the 1967 Hong Kong riots, the Red Guards stormed the premises, looted the Office of British Chargé d'Affaires (predecessor body of embassy) and burnt it on 23 August.

Other locations
The consular section is now too large to be accommodated in the embassy building (referred to locally as the 'main building'). It is now housed at the Kerry Centre, 1 kilometer away. Visa applications are handled at a centre shared with the Republic of Ireland at Chaoyangmen.

Outside Beijing, there are also British consulates general in Guangzhou, Wuhan, Chongqing and Shanghai where the senior officer is known as the consul-general. There is also a British consulate-general in Hong Kong (the largest British consulate-general in the world), responsible for maintaining British ties with Hong Kong and Macao. However, due to Hong Kong's unique status, the consul-general reports directly to the China Department of the Foreign and Commonwealth Office, instead of going through the British ambassador in Beijing.

The Embassy also represents the British Overseas Territories in China.

See also
China-United Kingdom relations
Embassy of China, London
List of Ambassadors of the United Kingdom to China

References

Bibliography
 

Beijing
United Kingdom
Buildings and structures in Chaoyang District, Beijing
China–United Kingdom relations